Melcher Risberg (16 February 1930 – 31 August 2001) was a Swedish cross-country skier. He competed in the 50 km race at the 1964 and 1968 Winter Olympics and placed tenth and fifth, respectively.

References

External links
 

1930 births
2001 deaths
Swedish male cross-country skiers
Olympic cross-country skiers of Sweden
Cross-country skiers at the 1964 Winter Olympics
Cross-country skiers at the 1968 Winter Olympics
People from Krokom Municipality